Ovum Recordings is a house music record label founded by Josh Wink and King Britt in October 1994. It is based in Philadelphia.

The label celebrated its 20th anniversary in 2014 with a world tour putting on a series of club events plus a special remix of the Josh Wink classic "Are You There?"

Artists
The label initially gained media attention though Wink's own releases (through pseudonyms such as Winx and Size 9) though releases from other influential producers soon followed, including tracks from house music pioneers DJ Pierre and Lil Louis. (Louis is credited on Josh Wink on "How's Your Evening So Far?", a track based on a sample of Lil Louis' classic French Kiss.)

Other notable contributors
Boo Williams
DJ Pierre
DJ Sneak
Ian Pooley
Jimpster
KiNK
Levon Vincent
Loco Dice
Stefan Goldmann
Tom Middleton

References

External links
 
 Ovum on Resident Advisor
 

American record labels
House music record labels
Record labels established in 1994